This is a list of mayors of Raleigh since the creation of the office in 1857.  The Mayor is the head of a council-manager system of government for Raleigh, North Carolina.  The office was created in 1857 when a new charter was established for the city to replace the original 1795 charter. Mayor William H. Harrison was mayor during the Confederate States of America and eventually surrendered the city back to the United States before Sherman's March to the Sea arrived.

Intendants of Police
Under Raleigh's original 1795 charter, the equivalent of a mayor was called the "Intendant of Police" (a title borrowed from France).  The first person to hold the office was John Haywood.  He was elected by the city board of commissioners (who were themselves appointed by the North Carolina General Assembly). Starting in 1803, intendants of police were elected annually by all land-owning free men, including free African-Americans.

List of mayors

See also
 Timeline of Raleigh, North Carolina

Footnotes

External links
Raleigh city history

Raleigh, North Carolina